RPHS can refer to:
 Ridge Point High School, Fort Bend County, Texas
 Risdon Park High School, Port Pirie, South Australia (closed 1994)
 Roselle Park High School, Union County, New Jersey
 Raynes Park High School,  Raynes Park, England
 Ridgefield Park High School,  Bergen County, New Jersey
 Registered Phlebology Sonographer